Herbert Edward Arntson (April 8, 1911 – November 27, 1982) was a writer of juvenile historical fiction from  Tacoma, Washington.

Arntson attended the University of Puget Sound for his undergraduate and master's degrees, both as an English major. For his doctoral degree he went to the University of Washington. He was married to Dorothy Arntson.

He was an English teacher for high school and college students. He headed the creative writing program at Washington State University for 28 years. His collected papers are held at the University of Oregon library archives.

His historical fiction stories center in and around Oregon's Willamette Valley during the mid-19th century. He died in Grapeview, Washington in 1982.

Writings

References

1982 deaths
1911 births
University of Puget Sound alumni
University of Washington alumni
Washington State University faculty
20th-century American writers
Writers from Tacoma, Washington
20th-century American male writers